Sadykierz may refer to the following places in Poland:

Sadykierz, Łódź Voivodeship (central Poland)
Sadykierz, Maków County in Masovian Voivodeship (east-central Poland)
Sadykierz, Ropczyce-Sędziszów County in Subcarpathian Voivodeship (south-east Poland)
Sadykierz, Pułtusk County in Masovian Voivodeship (east-central Poland)